Vice-Admiral Sir David Mitchell ( – 1 June 1710) was a Scottish admiral, courtier and parliamentary official.

He came from humble origins, being descended from, as John Charnock put it, a family "more distinguished for their integrity than their riches". When he was sixteen years old, his father apprenticed him to the master of a trading vessel from Leith. Having served this apprenticeship, he acted as mate aboard various vessels engaged in the Baltic trade.

On the outbreak of the Third Anglo-Dutch War in 1672, he was pressed into service in the Royal Navy. He served aboard this vessel under the command of vice admiral Arthur Herbert in the Mediterranean, and returned home with him in July 1683.

He sailed this vessel to the West Indies, where he spent two years convoying slave ships and pursuing Joseph Bannister and other pirates. He was discharged from the Ruby in October 1686 and given no other command. Eventually, he made his way to the Netherlands and joined the group of naval defectors collecting around William of Orange.

In August 1690, Mitchell was one of four candidates put forward to Queen Mary for promotion to admiral, the others being George Churchill, Matthew Aylmer and Francis Wheler. Apart from a four-month sojourn in the winter of 1691, when he was major of the 1st Maritime Regiment, he commanded this ship until January 1693 and led her into the battles of Barfleur and La Hogue.

He was knighted by William III, apparently informally, about May 1694 before he joined Edward Russell, 1st Earl of Orford's grand fleet, but was officially dubbed a Knight Bachelor at Kensington, London, on 6 December 1698.

He was a Commissioner of the Admiralty from 1699 to 1702 and a Member of the Lord High Admiral's Council 1702 to 1708. He obtained numerous royal honours and appointments, including that of Gentleman Usher of the Black Rod. Because of his naval knowledge, he became a close professional friend of Tsar Peter the Great. David Mitchell's coat of arms are stated by De Neve to be appropriated for his tomb without justification from the Mitchells of Tillygrieg ('he bears arms, but hath no right', citing his humble background).

During the Grand Embassy of Peter the Great in 1697-1699, Mitchell captained the flagship York, which brought him to England. During the voyage the Tsar was given instruction on ship handling by Mitchell, mostly in Dutch since they were both fluent in it. At the Tsar's request, Mitchell was assigned as his official escort and translator during the nearly six months Peter was in London.

References

Sources

archives at RootsWeb.com

1650s births
1710 deaths
Military personnel from Edinburgh
Lords of the Admiralty
Scottish admirals
Royal Navy vice admirals
Scottish politicians
Gentlemen Ushers
Ushers of the Black Rod
Knights Bachelor